Orpierre is a commune in the Hautes-Alpes department in southeastern France. The village has multiple venues for sport climbing nearby; one is directly to the north of the village.

Population

See also
Communes of the Hautes-Alpes department

References

Communes of Hautes-Alpes
Dauphiné